Albin Johnsén better known by the mononym Albin (born 22 July 1989, in Boo, Stockholm county) is a Swedish artist, rapper and songwriter. He gained fame with his 2014 song "Din soldat" that also featured vocals from Kristin Amparo and was co-written by Albin and Mattias Andréasson known as DNA. The song reached number one on the Swedish Singles Chart. The follow-up "Vilken jävla smäll", featured by Amparo and co-written with Andréasson, was used in the soundtrack for the film Den perfekta stöten. Albin and Andréasson have further collaborated on the songs "Moment 22" and "Frank", the latter dedicated to Albin's son called Frank.

Albin was nominated for a number of awards including P3 Guld and the Swedish Grammies gala for best Swedish song for "Din soldat". Albin is a successful songwriter who has written for other artists, including "Losing Myself Without You" for Mollie Lindén during her time at Idol series and culminating as a single by her. He also wrote "Det rår vi inte för" for Behrang Miri that the latter performed during Melodifestivalen 2015 competition.

Albin and Andréasson took part in Melodifestivalen 2016 in a bid to represent Sweden in the Eurovision Song Contest with the song "Rik" as duo Albin & Mattias. After their performance on the first semi final of the competition on 6 February 2016, it moved to the "Andra Chansen" stage on 5 March 2016, where it lost to "Put Your Love On Me" by Boris René.

Discography

Albums

EPs

Singles

Writing credits
2014: "Losing Myself Without You" for Mollie Lindén
2015: "Det rår vi inte för" for Behrang Miri

Notes

References

Swedish rappers
Swedish songwriters
1989 births
Living people
Singers from Stockholm
Melodifestivalen contestants of 2020
Melodifestivalen contestants of 2016